Silverball Studios Limited, formerly known as Fuse Games Limited, was a British video game developer known for developing pinball games for Nintendo.

History

Fuse Games Limited era
The company was founded in 2002 by Adrian Barritt and Richard Horrocks, makers of the award-winning Pro Pinball series of computer games. As an idea to show what they were capable of, they developed a Mario pinball demo and pitched the idea to Nintendo, who then hired the company to make Mario Pinball Land for the Game Boy Advance. The whole game was made by just five people. Later, Fuse Games developed Nintendo DS games, the most notable being Metroid Prime Pinball, a pinball adaptation of the GameCube game Metroid Prime. The studio also became the only developer outside Japan to create a Touch! Generations game, with Active Health with Carol Vorderman.

Silverball Studios Limited era
In 2009, the company nearly went bankrupt after completing Pinball Pulse: The Ancients Beckon for DSiWare, but reformed as Silverball Studios. The company attempted to revive the Pro Pinball series through Kickstarter in 2012. The project's goal was unsuccessful, and the company eventually merged into Barnstorm Games as the in-house development team. Afterwards, the Kickstarter was revived in 2013, but was limited to the single table Timeshock!. This campaign reached its goal and the Ultra Edition of Pro-Pinball: Timeshock! was released for several platforms.

Games

Game Boy Advance
Mario Pinball Land (2004)

Nintendo DS
Metroid Prime Pinball (2005)
Active Health with Carol Vorderman (2009)
Pinball Pulse: The Ancients Beckon (2009)
Thomas & Friends: Hero of the Rails (2010)

Wii
Thomas & Friends: Hero of the Rails (2010)

iPhone
Mensa Brain Test (2010)
Frogger Pinball (2011)

Nintendo 3DS
BearShark: The Game (2013)

Windows/Xbox 360 Arcade
Pro Pinball: Timeshock! - The Ultra Edition (2014)

References

External links
Fuse Games Limited
Silverball Studios Limited

Defunct video game companies of the United Kingdom
Video game development companies
Video game companies established in 2002
British companies established in 2002